Carla Ruocco (born 28 July 1973) is an Italian politician from the Five Star Movement who served in the Chamber of Deputies from 2013 to 2022.

References 

Living people
1973 births
21st-century Italian politicians
21st-century Italian women politicians
Five Star Movement politicians
Deputies of Legislature XVII of Italy
Deputies of Legislature XVIII of Italy
Women members of the Chamber of Deputies (Italy)